Etna is an unincorporated community in Polk County, in the U.S. state of Georgia.

History
The community was named after nearby Etna Mountain. The Georgia General Assembly incorporated the place in 1892 as the "Town of Etna". The town's municipal charter was repealed in 1995.

References

Former municipalities in Georgia (U.S. state)
Unincorporated communities in Polk County, Georgia
Unincorporated communities in Georgia (U.S. state)
Populated places disestablished in 1995